The deceleron,  or split aileron, was developed in the late 1940s by Northrop, originally for use on the F-89 Scorpion fighter. It is a two-part aileron that can be deflected as a unit to provide roll control, or split open to act as an air brake. Decelerons are used on the Fairchild Republic A-10 Thunderbolt II and the Northrop Grumman B-2 Spirit flying wing. In differential use they impart yaw moment, potentially obviating the rudder and vertical stabilizer control surface, although requiring active flight control.

See also
 Spoileron

References

 XF-89 Research Report

External links

Aircraft controls